Eternal Lies is a 2013 role-playing game adventure published by Pelgrane Press for Trail of Cthulhu.

Contents
Eternal Lies is an adventure that is part of a massive campaign. The print edition was also published in a special pre-release bundle with the soundtrack album and a PDF.

Reception
John O'Neill reviewed Eternal Lies for Black Gate, and stated that "Eternal Lies maintains the extremely high standards of the previous adventures. There are a number of excellent twists and turns in the story, as the players confront a worldwide cult and the alien forces behind it and take on an escalating quest to save humanity. There's a lot of material here, but the writing is top notch and the book is a real pleasure to read."

Eternal Lies won the 2014 Gold ENnie Awards for Best Adventure and the Silver ENnie for Best Production Values.

References

External links
Eternal Lies at RPGGeek

ENnies winners
Role-playing game adventures
Role-playing game supplements introduced in 2013